Seong Sam-mun (1418 — 8 June 1456) was a scholar-official of early Joseon who rose to prominence in the court of King Sejong the Great (r. 1418–1450). He was executed after being implicated in a plot to dethrone King Sejo (r. 1455–1468) and restore his predecessor King Danjong (r. 1452–1455), and is known as one of the sayuksin (사육신, the six martyred ministers) with reference to this plot.

Biography

Sam-mun was born in Hongseong (then Hongju), South Chungcheong province to a yangban family of the Changnyeong Seong clan (창녕 성씨, 昌寧 成氏).  He passed the lower examination at the regular triennial administration in 1438. He soon gained the favor of King Sejong, and was appointed to the Hall of Worthies. From 1442 to 1446, he cooperated with other members of that body to compose the Hunmin Jeongeum, in which the hangul alphabet was first presented to the world.  The level of his involvement in the creation of the Korean alphabet Hangul (and that of other Hall of Worthies scholars) is disputed, although he and other scholars were sent on trips to consult with a Ming Chinese phoneticist several times, presumably because one of the first uses the new alphabet was put to was to transcribe the sounds of hanja, or Sino-Korean characters. In 1447, Sam-mun achieved the highest score on the higher literary examination.

In 1455, Prince Suyang (one of Sejong's sons) forced the young King Danjong, his nephew, to abdicate, taking the throne instead as King Sejo. Following secret orders from his father Seong Seung, Sam-mun along with Bak Jungrim, Bak Paengnyeon and others plotted to assassinate the new king and restore King Danjong to the throne. The plot was exposed and the plotters all arrested. Sam-mun and his father were executed along with other plotters. Before his execution, Sam-mun condemned the king as a pretender. The sayuksin and the saengyuksin (생육신, the six retainers who lived), who refused to accept King Sejo as the legitimate king, were praised by later generations for holding fast to the Confucian value of staying loyal to the true king.

Poems for his loyalty
He made several poems during imprisonment and before his execution.  The following is his death poem.

擊鼓催人命 (격고최인명) -둥둥 북소리는 내 생명을 재촉하고,

回頭日欲斜 (회두일욕사) -머리를 돌여 보니 해는 서산으로 넘어 가려고 하는구나
 
黃泉無一店 (황천무일점) -황천으로 가는 길에는 주막조차 없다는데,

今夜宿誰家 (금야숙수가) -오늘밤은 뉘 집에서 잠을 자고 갈거나

As the sound of drum calls for my life,

I turn my head where the sun is about to set.

In the afterlife, there is not a single inn

This night, at whose house shall I rest ?

Another poem in prison written in sijo format

Another poem (using 7 words in each line)

Family 
 Great-Great-Great-Grandfather 
 Seong Gung-pil (성공필, 成公弼) 
 Great-Great-Great-Grandfather 
 Seong Gun-mi (성군미, 成君美)
 Great-Great-Grandfather 
 Seong Yeo-wan (성여완, 成汝完) (1309 - 1397)
 Great-Great-Grandmother
 Lady Na (나씨, 羅氏); second daughter of Na Cheon-bu (나천부, 羅天富)
 Great-Grandfather 
 Seong Seok-yong (성석용, 成石瑢) (1352 - 26 April 1403)
 Great-Grandmother 
 Lady Kim (김씨, 金氏); second daughter of Kim Seong-ri (김성리, 金成利)
 Grandfather 
 Seong Dal-saeng (성달생, 成達生) (1376 - 1444)
 Grandmother 
 Lady Jo of the Pungyang Jo clan (풍양 조씨); daughter of Jo Woon-gae (조운개, 趙云价)
 Father
 Seong Seung (성승, 成勝) (? - 8 June 1456)
 Mother 
 Biological - Lady Park of the Juksan Park clan (죽산 박씨); Seong Seung’s first wife
 Grandfather - Park Cheom (박첨)
 Step - Lady Mi-chi (미치, 未致); became a slave of Yi Heung-sang, Prince Gyerim (계림군 이흥상) after husband’s death 
 Unnamed stepmother of commoner status 
 Siblings
 Younger brother - Seong Sam-bing (성삼빙, 成三聘) (? - 1456)
 Sister-in-law - Lady Ui-jeong (의정, 義貞); became a slave of Kwon Gae (권개, 權愷) after her husband’s death
 Nephew - Seong Han (성한)
 Younger brother - Seong Sam-go (성삼고(成三顧) (? - 1456)
 Sister-in-law - Kim Sa-geum (김사금, 金四今), Lady Kim (김씨, 金氏); daughter of Kim Ryeon (김련, 金憐), remarried to Kim Su-son (김수손, 金首孫)
 Niece - Lady Seong (성씨)
 Younger brother - Seong Sam-seong (성삼성, 成三省) (? - 1456)
 Sister-in-law - Lady Myeong-su (명수, 命守); became a slave of Hong Dal-son (홍달손, 洪達孫) after husband’s death 
 Younger half-sister - Seong Seong-geum (성성금, 成性今), Lady Seong; became a slave of Shin Suk-ju (신숙주, 申叔舟) after her father’s death
 Younger half-sister - Seong Ok-dong (성옥동, 成玉童), Lady Seong; became a slave of Park Won-hyeong (박원형, 朴元亨) after her father’s death
 Wives and their children 
 Lady Shin of the Ahju Shin clan (아주 신씨, 鵝洲 申氏) — no issue.
 Kim Cha-san (김차산, 金次山), Lady Kim of the Yeonan Kim clan (연안 김씨, 延安 金氏)
 Son - Seong Maeng-cheom (성맹첨, 成孟瞻) (? - 1456)
 Daughter-in-law - Lady Hyeon-bi (현비, 現非); became a slave of Jeon Gyun (전균, 田畇)
 Son - Seong Maeng-nyeon (성맹년) (? - 1456)
 Granddaughter - Lady Seong (성씨)
 Grandson-in-law - Yu Jeub (유즙) of the Munhwa Yu clan
 Daughter - Seong Hyo-ok (성효옥), Lady Seong; unmarried and became a slave 
 Daughter - Lady Seong (성씨, 成氏) (1439 - 1489)
 Son-in-law - Park Rim-gyeong (박림경, 朴臨卿) (1436 - 1485)
 Grandson - Park Jeung (박증, 朴增) (1461 - 1517)
 Grandson - Park Ho (박호, 朴壕) (1466 - 1533)
 Grandson - Park Han (박한, 朴한)
 Daughter - Lady Seong (성씨, 成氏)
 Son-in-law - Eom Jeong-gu (엄정구, 嚴鼎耉)
 Grandson - Eom Chan (엄찬)
 Son - Seong Heon (성헌) 
 Son - Seong Taek (성택)

In popular culture
 Portrayed by Hyun Woo in the 2011 SBS TV series Deep Rooted Tree.

See also 
 Joseon Dynasty politics
 History of Korea
 List of Joseon Dynasty people

References

External links 
 Shrine of Seong Sam-mun in Hongseong County
  Biography
  신숙주가 본 ‘죽마고우’ 성삼문 from Dong-a Ilbo

1418 births
1456 deaths
People from Hongseong County
Joseon scholar-officials
15th-century Korean poets
Korean male poets
People executed by dismemberment